

Medalists

Standings
Men's Competition

Results
The teams were divided into two groups of three and four teams. The top two from each group advanced to the semi-finals.

Final:  -   7-4

Third place:  -  11-0

References
Complete 1979 Mediterranean Games Standings Archived

1979 in water polo
Sports at the 1979 Mediterranean Games
1979
1979 Mediterranean Games